Jack Freeman (15 November 1891 – 15 November 1916) was an Australian rules footballer who played with South Melbourne in the Victorian Football League.

Family
The son of Frederick and Margaret Freeman, née McGuiness, he was born on 15 November 1891. He died of wounds received on active service on 15 November 1916.

Football
Top goalscorer for South Melbourne in 1914.

Military
He enlisted in the First AIF in July 1915. He was badly wounded in France; and, after having both legs amputated, he died in a military hospital on his 25th birthday.

See also
 List of Victorian Football League players who died in active service

Footnotes

References
 Holmesby, Russell & Main, Jim (2007). The Encyclopedia of AFL Footballers. 7th ed. Melbourne: Bas Publishing.
 Gallant Australians: One of Australia's Heroes, The Preston Leader, (Saturday, 20 January 1917), p.3.
 Roll of Honour: Sapper Jack Freeman (2477).
 World War I Service Record: Jack Freeman (2477), National Archives of Australia.
 World War I Nominal Roll: Sapper Jack Freeman (2477), Australian War Museum.
 World War I Embarkation Roll: Sapper Jack Freeman (2477), Australian War Museum.

External links

1891 births
1916 deaths
Australian rules footballers from Victoria (Australia)
Sydney Swans players
Australian military personnel killed in World War I
Australian amputees
Military personnel from Victoria (Australia)
People from Bairnsdale